Anna-Kajsa Norman (1820–1903), known as Spel-Stina or Spelstina (Playing Stina), was a Swedish folk musician, a spelman (violinist), and a composer.

Life
Norman was born in Dalarna and lived her adult life in Torsåker. Originally working as servant, she came to be regarded as one of the best spelmans in Gästrikland for her skill as a violinist within folk music. Female spelmans were a rarity, and she is also one of the few female spelmans which are sufficiently documented.

Norman was unmarried but lived with Erik Hellström i Berg, with whom she had five children, among them her son Anders, who wrote down her songs.

Anna-Kajsa Norman composed two collections of songs: Från Hälsingland and Från Delsbo.

Legacy
In 2004, Spelstinamedaljen (The Spelstina Medal) and Spelstinastipendiet (The Spelstina Scholarship) was named after her. It is annually awarded female folk musicians.

References

 https://web.archive.org/web/20160304034652/http://www.folkmusikfesten.nu/?link=arrangemang%2F2009%2Ftorsaker%2Fbakgrund.php
 Korpögat. Torsåkers sockentidning, juni 2009
 Nr 2 2014 Medlemsblad för Gästriklands Spelmansförbund
 Spelstinafestival - www.torsakershembygdsforening.se

1820 births
1903 deaths
Swedish fiddlers
Swedish composers
Fiddlers from Sweden
Swedish women composers
19th-century Swedish musicians
19th-century Swedish women musicians